
Year 536 (Roman numerals: DXXXVI) was a leap year starting on Tuesday of the Julian calendar. At the time, it was known as the Year after the Consulship of Belisarius. The denomination 536 for this year has been used since the early medieval period, when the Anno Domini calendar era became the prevalent method in Europe for naming years.

In 2018, medieval scholar Michael McCormick nominated 536 as "the worst year to be alive" because of the extreme weather events probably caused by a volcanic eruption early in the year, causing average temperatures in Europe and China to decline and resulting in crop failures and famine for well over a year. Other researchers have noted additional adverse events during the year, including a mysterious fog, possibly due to the volcanic eruption.

Events 
 By place 
 Byzantine Empire 
 Spring – Emperor Justinian I appoints his cousin Germanus as magister militum to deal with the crisis in Africa. He sends a mobile force of comitatenses (mostly cavalry) and an elite guard. Solomon, the previous magister militum, returns to Constantinople.
 Summer – Gothic War (535–554): Belisarius crosses the Strait of Messina and invades Italy. He conquers the city of Rhegium and advances to Naples.
 November – Siege of Naples: Belisarius captures Naples after a month's siege, by sending troops into the city through an abandoned Roman aqueduct.
 December 9 – Belisarius enters Rome through the Porta Asinaria, and the Gothic garrison of 4,000 men flees the city. He sends an urgent request for reinforcements to Justinian I, meanwhile preparing Rome for a siege, by bringing in great quantities of food and other supplies.
 Winter – Belisarius sets up his headquarters on the Pincian Hill, and repairs the neglected city walls of Rome. He stations a 5,000-man garrison, of whom half are his personal bodyguard (bucellarii). To hold parts of the city, he recruits 20,000 young Romans to man the walls.

 Europe 
 Early in 536 (possible) – Volcanic winter of 536: A volcano erupts in Iceland. Famine is described in the Annals of Ulster.
 March – Ostrogothic King Theodahad cedes Provence and upper Alamannia to the Franks, gaining their support in the war. He sends a large Gothic army into Dalmatia. They defeat the Byzantines, Mundus is killed during the fighting at Salona, and the Byzantine army withdraws.
 Summer – Constantinianus, magister militum per Illyricum, retakes Dalmatia. The Goths abandon Salona and withdraw to the north. The Byzantines rebuild its walls and reclaim the province.
 December – Vitiges deposes his rival Theodahad at Ravenna, and marries Matasuntha (daughter of queen Amalasuntha). He becomes king of the Ostrogoths and assembles an army to fight against Belisarius.

 Africa 
 March - April – Belisarius sails to Carthage with 1,000 men, to suppress a mutiny against Solomon. Meanwhile, Carthage is besieged by 9,000 rebels, including many Vandals, under Stotzas.
 Battle of the River Bagradas: Belisarius defeats the mutineers, and hurries back to Sicily.

 Asia 
 January 26 – Senka succeeds his brother Ankan, as the 28th emperor of Japan.
 August – Volcanic winter of 536: Snow falls in China, which causes the harvest to be delayed.

 By topic 
 Religion 
 Before March 13 – Anthimus I is deposed as patriarch of Constantinople in favour of Menas.
 April 22 – Pope Agapetus I dies in Constantinople, after a reign of just ten months. He is succeeded by Silverius as the 58th pope.
 May 2–June 4 – Council of Constantinople.
 September 19 – Council of Jerusalem.
 The Little Hagia Sophia in Constantinople (begun in 527) is completed as the Church of Saints Sergius and Bacchus.

 Climate 
 Extreme weather events of 535–536, thought to have been caused by an extensive veil of dust in the atmosphere, begin in the Northern Hemisphere. They continue until the following year, causing unseasonal weather and crop failure worldwide. It is possible this is caused by the eruption of a volcano: Krakatoa, Ilopango in El Salvador (Central America); in North America; or in Iceland.

Births 
unknown date – Li Ezi, Chinese empress dowager of Northern Zhou (d. 588)
 probable
Evagrius Scholasticus, Syrian church historian (or 537) (d. 594)
Venantius Fortunatus, Merovingian bishop and poet (d. c. 600/609)

Deaths 
 January 25 – Ankan, emperor of Japan (b. c. 466)
 April 22 – Pope Agapetus I
 December – Theodahad, king of the Ostrogoths (assassinated) (b. c. 480)
unknown date – Mundus, Gepid Byzantine general (killed in action)

Notes and references

Notes

References